James Leslie was a Scottish footballer who played for clubs including Clyde and Sunderland, as a forward.

He made his debut for Sunderland on 4 September 1897 against Sheffield Wednesday in a 1–0 win at Olive Grove. Overall, he made 98 Football League and FA Cup appearances while at the club from 1897 to 1901, scoring 29 goals. He scored Roker Park's first ever goal in a 1–0 win over Liverpool in September 1898 and was part of the team which finished runners-up in 1897–98 and again in 1900–01, but had departed for Middlesbrough by the time they claimed the title the following season.

References

1873 births
Year of death missing
Scottish footballers
Clyde F.C. players
Bolton Wanderers F.C. players
Middlesbrough F.C. players
Arthurlie F.C. players
Sunderland A.F.C. players
People from Barrhead
Association football forwards
Sportspeople from East Renfrewshire
English Football League players
Scottish Football League players